
Stausee Ferden ("Ferden reservoir") is a reservoir on the Lonza river at Ferden, Valais, Switzerland.

See also
List of mountain lakes of Switzerland

Lakes of Valais
Reservoirs in Switzerland